Events from the year 1600 in Germany.

Births 

 Robert Roberthin
 Albert Curtz
 Joseph Heintz the Younger
 Fryderyk Getkant
 Susanna Mayr
 Johann Schröder

Deaths 

 Caspar Hennenberger
 Johann Major
 Johann Wolff
 Margaret Stuart
 Jacob Heerbrand